Class J: Political science is a classification used by the Library of Congress Classification system. This article outlines the subclasses of Class J.

J - General legislative and executive papers 

(1)-981.......General legislative and executive papers
(1)-(9)......Gazettes (Note: The Library of Congress now classes this material in class K)
80-87........United States
80-82.......Presidents' messages and other executive papers
100-981......Other regions and countries

JA - Political science (General) 

1-92.....Political science (General)
1-26......Periodicals
27-34.....Societies
35.5......Congresses
60-64.....Dictionaries and Encyclopedias
71-80.....Theory. Relations to other subjects
81-84.....History
86-88.....Study and Teaching. Research
92........Collective Biography of political scientists

JC - Political theory. The state. Theories of the state 

11-605.....Political theory. The state. Theories of the state
47............Oriental state
49............Islamic state
51-93.........Ancient state
109-121.......Medieval state
131-273.......Modern state
177-178......Thomas Paine
311-314.......Nationalism. Nation state
319-323.......Political Geography
327...........Sovereignty
328.2.........Consensus. Consent of the governed
328.6-328.65..Violence. Political violence
329...........Patriotism
345-347.......Symbolism
348-497.......Forms of the state
571-605.......Purpose, functions, and relations of the state

JF - Political institutions and public administration 

20-2112.........Political institutions and public administration
20-1177........General. Comparative government
51-56.........General works. History
225-619.......Organs and functions of the government
251-289......Executive. Heads of State
331-341......Parliamentary government
419-691......Legislation. Legislative process. Law-making
799-1177......Political rights. Political participation
1338-2112......Public administration
1501-1521.....Civil service
2011-2112.....Political parties

JJ - Political institutions and public administration - North America 

1000-1019.....Political institutions and public administration (North America)

JK - Political institutions and public administration - United States 

1-9993............Political institutions and public administration - United States
1-9593...........United States
404-1685........Government. Political administration
501-868........Executive branch
631-868.......Civil service. Departments and agencies
1012-1432......Congress. Legislative branch
1154-1276.....Senate
1308-1432.....House of Representatives
1606-1683......Capital. Public buildings. Government property. Government purchasing.
1717-2217.......Political Rights. Practical politics
1758-1761......Citizenship
1846-1929......Suffrage
1965-2217......Electoral System
2255-2391.......Political parties
2403-9593.......State government
9663-9993........Confederate States of America

JL - Political institutions and public administration - Canada, Latin America, etc 

1-3899..........Political institutions and public administration - Canada, Latin America, etc
1-500..........Canada
599.5-839......West Indies. Caribbean Area
1200-1299......Mexico
1400-1679......Central America
1850-3899......South America

JN - Political institutions and public administration - Europe 

1-9689............Political institutions and public administration - Europe
1-97.............General
101-1371.........United Kingdom
1187-1371.......Scotland
1395-1571.5......Ireland
1601-2191........Austria-Hungary. Austria. Hungary.
2210-2229........Czech Republic. Czechoslovakia.
2240.............Slovakia
2301-3007........France
3201-4944........Germany
5001-5191........Greece
5201-5690........Italy
5701-5999........Netherlands
6101-6371........Belgium
6500-6598........Soviet Union. Russia. Post-Soviet states.
6615.............Estonia
6630-6639........Ukraine
6640-6649........Belarus
6680-6689........Moldova
6690-6699........Russian Federation
6370-6379........Latvia
6745.............Lithuania
6750-6769........Poland
7011-7066........Scandinavia. Northern Europe.
7101-7367........Denmark
7370-7379........Greenland
7380-7389........Iceland
7390-7399........Finland
7401-7695........Norway
7721-7995........Sweden
8101-8399........Spain
8423-8661........Portugal
8701-9599........Switzerland
9600-9689........Balkan states

JQ - Political institutions and public administration - Asia, Africa, Australia, Pacific Area, etc 

21-6651..............Political institutions and public administration - Asia, Africa, Australia, Pacific Area, etc
21-1852.............Asia
200-620............India
1070-1199..........Central Asia (Including Post-Soviet states)
1499-1749..........East Asia (Including China, Japan, North Korea, South Korea)
1758-1852..........Middle East (Including Turkey, Iran, Israel, Arabian Peninsula)
1850..............Arabic countries
1852..............Islamic countries
1870-3981...........Africa
3981.5-3986.7.......Atlantic Ocean islands
3995-6651...........Australia, New Zealand, Oceania

JS - Local government. Municipal government 

39-8500.......Local government. Municipal government
55-68........History
141-163......Executive branch. Mayor
171..........Legislative branch
221-227......Elections. Local elections. Municipal elections.
241-271......Local government other than municipal
300-1582.....United States
1701-1800....Canada
1840-2058.9..West Indies. Caribbean area.
2101-2143....Mexico
2145-2219....Central America
2300-2778....South America
3000-2949.89.Europe
6950-7520....Asia
7510........Arab countries
7520........Islamic countries
7525-7819.9..Africa
7820-7827.9..Atlantic Ocean islands
7900-7906.9..Indian Ocean islands
8001-8490.9..Australia. New Zealand. Pacific Ocean islands

JV - Colonies and colonization,  Emigration and Immigration.  International migration 

1-5397............Colonies and colonization
1-9..............Periodicals. Serials
10-19............Societies
61-152...........History
412-461..........Administration
500-5397.........Colonizing nations
6001-9480.........Emigration and immigration. International migration
6001-6006........Periodicals. Serials
6021-6033........History
6091-6124........Emigration
6201-6347........Immigration
6403-7127........United States
7200-7539........Canada, Latin America, etc.
7590-8339.7......Europe
8490-8758........Asia
8760.............Arab countries
8762.............Islamic countries
8790-9024.5......Africa
9029-9036........Atlantic Ocean islands
9040-9047........Indian Ocean islands
9100-9269........Australia, New Zealand
9290-9470........Pacific Ocean islands

JX - International law (obsolete) 

(1)-(6650)............International Law see KZ or JZ
(63)-(191)...........Collections. Documents. Cases.
(220)-(1195).........Collections, cases, etc. By country.
(1261)-(1283)........Codification of international law
(1305)-(1598)........Foreign relations
(1621)-(1896)........Diplomacy
(1901)-(1995)........International arbitration, organizations, etc.
(2001)-(6650)........International law

JZ - International relations 

5-6530..........International relations
5.5-18.........Periodicals
24-38..........Societies, associations, academies, institutes, etc., for the study of international relations
63-1153........Sources
221-1153......By country
1249-1254......Relation to other disciplines and topics
1305-2060......Scope of international relations
1329.5-1395...By period
1400-1454.....Diplomatic and consular service
1464-2060.....Scope of international relations with regard to countries, territories, regions, etc.
3674-3875......State territory and its parts
3685..........Boundaries
3686-3875.....International waters
4835-5490......International organization and associations
4841-4848.....Political Non-governmental organizations
4850-5490.....Intergovernmental organizations
4893-4934....League of Nations
4935-5160....United Nations
5511.2-6300....Promotion of peace. Peaceful change
5514-5526.....Societies, associations, academies, institutes, etc., for peace promotion, research and education
5527-5532.....Congresses and conferences
5587-6009.....International security. Disarmament. Global survival
6010-6060.....Pacific settlement of international disputes
6360-6377......Non-military coercion
6385-6405......The armed conflict. War and order
6422-6422.5....Neutrality. Non-participation in wars. Norms of neutrality.
6350...........Humanitarian aspects of war

References

Further reading 
 Full schedule of all LCC Classifications
 List of all LCC Classification Outlines

J